The 1940–41 Chicago Black Hawks season was the team's 15th season in the NHL, and they were coming off a very good regular season in 1939–40, finishing above .500 for the first time in 4 seasons, however, they were quickly eliminated in 2 games by the Detroit Red Wings in the playoffs.

The Black Hawks would have a rough regular season in 1940–41, slipping to a 16–25–7 record, good for 39 points and 5th place in the NHL, and a 2nd straight playoff berth.  The Hawks would score 112 goals, the 2nd fewest in the 7 team league, and they would allow 139 goals, which was the 3rd most.

Bill Thoms would lead the club in scoring with 32 points, while George Allen would get a team high 14 goals, and Doug Bentley would lead the club with 20 assists.  Team captain Earl Seibert would anchor the blueline, earning 20 points, while fellow defenceman Joe Cooper had a club high 66 penalty minutes.

In goal, Paul Goodman would start the season, however, after a 7–10–4 start and a 2.50 GAA, he would be replaced by Sam LoPresti.  LoPresti would go on to a 9–15–3 record and a GAA of 3.02.

Chicago would play the 6th place team, the Montreal Canadiens in a best of 3 series in the 1st round of the playoffs, and in a close fought series, with all 3 games being decided by a goal, the Black Hawks would defeat the Canadiens and earn a 2nd round matchup against the Detroit Red Wings.  The Red Wings, who finished 14 points ahead of Chicago, would sweep the Black Hawks in 2 games, eliminating the Hawks from the playoffs.

Season standings

Record vs. opponents

Schedule and results

Regular season

Playoffs

Chicago Black Hawks 2, Montreal Canadiens 1

Detroit Red Wings 2, Chicago Black Hawks 0

Player statistics

Season statistics

Playoffs statistics

References 
 SHRP Sports
 The Internet Hockey Database
 National Hockey League Guide & Record Book 2007

Chicago Blackhawks seasons
Chicago
Chicago